The Commander of the Ukrainian Ground Forces is the professional head of the Ukrainian Ground Forces. In 2001–2005 it was known as Commander-in-Chief.

While the chief of ground forces post had been created in early 1992, it was over two years before the first holder, Colonel General Vasyl Sobkov, was appointed on 7 April 1994.

List of commanders
{| class="wikitable" style="text-align:center;"
|-
! rowspan=2| 
! rowspan=2| Portrait
! rowspan=2| Name
! colspan=3| Term of office
! rowspan=2| 
|-
! Took office
! Left office
! Time in office
|-style="text-align:center;"
! colspan=7| Commander 

|-style="text-align:center;"
! colspan=7| Commander-in-Chief 

|-style="text-align:center;"
! colspan=7| Commander

See also
 Commander of the Navy (Ukraine)
 Commander of the Air Force (Ukraine)
 Commander of the Air Defence Forces (Ukraine)
 Commander of the Air Assault Forces (Ukraine)

References

Commander
Ukraine